is a Japanese former short-track speed-skater.

Yoshizawa competed at the 2010 Winter Olympics for Japan. In the 500 metres, he advanced to the quarterfinals, where he finished 4th, failing to advance. In the 1500 metres, he placed 5th in his opening heat, advancing to the semifinals, where he finished 6th, again failing to advance. His best overall finish was in the 500, where he placed 14th.

Yoshizawa's best performance at the World Championships came in 2004, when he placed 5th as a member of the Japanese 5000 metre relay team. He also won a bronze medal at the 2004 World Short Track Speed Skating Team Championships for Japan.

Yoshizawa's top World Cup ranking in short track speed skating is 30th, in the 1500 metres in 2009–10.

References 

1985 births
Living people
Japanese male short track speed skaters
Short track speed skaters at the 2010 Winter Olympics
Olympic short track speed skaters of Japan
People from Nagano (city)